Neptunium(VII) oxide-hydroxide is a chemical compound which has neptunium in its highest oxidation state of +7. This compound reacts with basic salts such as potassium hydroxide to form neptunates (NpO53-) and water.
NpO2(OH)3 + 3KOH → K3NpO5 + 3H2O
Neptunium(VII) oxide-hydroxide is stable in an alkaline solution, however, it is slowly reduced to Np(VI) in an acidic solution. In water, it forms a greenish solution. This compound decomposes slowly to an oxidized solid.

Production
Neptunium(VII) oxide-hydroxide is produced by the oxidation of Np(VI) in alkaline solution with ozone, then neutralized with nitric acid to precipitate out the neptunium(VII) oxide-hydroxide.

References

Neptunium compounds
Hydroxides